The CAVB qualification for the 2006 FIVB Women's Volleyball World Championship saw member nations compete for three places at the finals in Japan.

Draw
13 CAVB national teams entered qualification. The teams were distributed according to their position in the FIVB Senior Women's Rankings as of 15 January 2004 using the serpentine system for their distribution. (Rankings shown in brackets)

First round

First round

Pool A
Venue:  Abdullah Al-Faisal Hall, Cairo, Egypt
Dates: March 17–19, 2005
All times are Eastern European Time (UTC+02:00)

|}

|}

Pool B
Venue:  Kasarani Hall, Nairobi, Kenya
Dates: July 20–24, 2005
All times are East Africa Time (UTC+03:00)

|}

|}

Pool C
Venue:  Gymnase Pandit-Sahadeo, Vacoas-Phoenix, Mauritius
Dates: April 22–24, 2005
All times are Mauritius Time (UTC+04:00)

|}

|}

References

External links
 2006 World Championship Qualification

2006 FIVB Volleyball Women's World Championship
2005 in volleyball
FIVB Volleyball World Championship qualification